Nino Ultimo Bolzoni (7 September 1903 – 13 May 1972) was an Italian rower. He competed at the 1928 Summer Olympics in Amsterdam with the men's coxless pair where they came fourth.

References

External links
 

1903 births
1972 deaths
Italian male rowers
Olympic rowers of Italy
Rowers at the 1928 Summer Olympics
Sportspeople from Cremona
European Rowing Championships medalists